Yan Bolagh or Yanbolagh may refer to:
 Yan Bolagh, Ardabil
 Yanbolagh, East Azerbaijan
 Yan Bolagh, Golestan
 Yan Bolagh, North Khorasan
 Yan Bolagh, Razavi Khorasan